SS Carlos Carrillo was an American Liberty ship built in 1943 for service in World War II.  Her namesake was Carlos Antonio Carrillo, an American Governor from 1837 to 1838.

Description 

The engine was built by the Worthington Pump & Machinery Corporation, Harrison, New Jersey.

Construction and career 
This particular ship was the 123rd liberty ship built by California Shipbuilding Corporation in Los Angeles.  She was laid down on 19 December 1942 and launched on 15 January 1943, later delivered on 31 January 1943. The United States War Shipping Administration gave the operations of the ship to American President Lines.

She departed Colombo together with Convoy JC 10 on 12 April 1943 for Calcutta while carrying army stores, she arrived six days later. The ship made two trips from Durban to Cape Town from 29 May until 2 June (Convoy DC 28) and from 6 June until 8 June (Convoy DC 29). From 17 November until 17 December, she was assigned to Convoy GUS 22 from Port Said to Hampton Roads.

Carlos Carrillo together with Convoy GZ 60 departed from Guantanamo, on 23 February 1944, for Cristóbal. Throughout 1944, she made independent trips to Milne Bay, Langemak Bay, Aitape, Morobe, Oro Bay, Biak, Lae, Auckland, Nouméa, Manus and Balboa. It was noted that Rear Admiral C.H.G. Benson decided to stay aboard Carlos Carrillo during Convoy UGS 45 from 12 June until 7 July.

The ship together with Convoy GB 734 arrived at Hollandia on 20 January 1945, from Morotai. It can also be noted that she towed the US Army Signal Corps' communications ship USS Geoanna. Carlos Carrillo took part in Convoy BG 513 from Biak to Morotai, from 6 to 9 February. On 21 March, together with Convoy BG 522, departed from Biak for Morotai, they arrived two days later. More than 50 ships took part in Convoy UGS 83, which sailed from Hampton Roads to Gibraltar, from 21 March to 14 April. Carlo Carrillo's last convoy was Convoy GB 745, in which they sailed from Morotai to Hollandia, from 1 to 4 April, during Convoy UGS 83.

She was scrapped in 1963.

References

 

Liberty ships
Ships built in Los Angeles
1943 ships